Bărăști is a commune in Olt County, Muntenia, Romania. It is composed of eight villages: Bărăștii de Cepturi, Bărăștii de Vede (the commune center), Boroești, Ciocănești, Lăzărești, Mereni, Moțoești and Popești.

References

Communes in Olt County
Localities in Muntenia